The 20th AVN Awards ceremony, presented by Adult Video News (AVN), took place January 11, 2003 at the Venetian Hotel Grand Ballroom, at Paradise, Nevada, U.S.A. During the ceremony, AVN presented AVN Awards in nearly 90 categories honoring the best pornographic films released between Oct. 1, 2001 and Sept. 30, 2002. The ceremony was produced by Gary Miller and directed by Mark Stone. Comedian Doug Stanhope co-hosted the show for the first time with adult film star Chloe.

The Fashionistas won 10 awards including Best Film and Best Director—Film for John Stagliano. Breathless and The Private Gladiator each took home four trophies, The Ass Collector and Perfect earned three awards apiece and several more movies won two awards each.

Winners and nominees

The nominees for the 20th AVN Awards were announced in November 2002. The Fashionistas led the way with 22, followed by Paradise Lost with 16, Les Vampyres 2 with 14, Breathess with 12 and Club Sin with 11.

The winners were announced during the awards ceremony on January 11, 2003. The 10 awards won by The Fashionistas were a record for the most awards at a single show. Lexington Steele's third win as Male Performer of the Year was also a record; previously, he, Rocco Siffredi and Tom Byron had each won twice.

Major awards

Winners are listed first, highlighted in boldface, and indicated with a double dagger.

Additional Award Winners 
These awards were announced, but not presented, in a pre-recorded winners-only segment shown on the ballroom's video monitors during the event. Trophies were given to the recipients off-stage:

 Adult Video Nudes Award: The Amazing Norma Stitz
 Best All-Girl Feature: The Violation of Aurora Snow
 Best All-Girl Series: The Violation Of...
 Best All-Girl Sex Scene—Film:  Belladonna, Taylor St. Claire, The Fashionistas
 Best All-Sex DVD: Breakin' 'Em In 2
 Best All-Sex Video: Bring 'Um Young 9
 Best Alternative Video: DreamGirls: Real Adventures 37
 Best Anal Sex Scene—Film: Kate Frost, Rocco Siffredi, The Fashionistas
 Best Anal-Themed Feature: Buttfaced! 3
 Best Anal-Themed Series: Ass Worship
 Best Art Direction—Film: Kris Kramski, America XXX
 Best Art Direction—Video: David Lockard, Hearts & Minds
 Best Box Cover Concept: Autumn Haze vs. Son of Dong
 Best Cinematography: Andrew Blake, The Villa
 Best Classic Release on DVD: Pretty Peaches 2
 Best Continuing Video Series: Naked Hollywood
 Best Director—Foreign Release: Antonio Adamo, The Private Gladiator
 Best Director—Non-Feature: Jim Powers, Perverted Stories 35
 Best DVD Authoring: Wicked Pictures DVD
 Best DVD Extras: Euphoria, Wicked Pictures DVD
 Best DVD Menus: The Private Gladiator: Collector's Limited Edition
 Best DVD Packaging: The Private Gladiator: Collector's Limited Edition, Private Media
 Best Editing—Film: Tricia Devereaux, John Stagliano, The Fashionistas Best Editing—Video: Ethan Kane, Perfect Best Ethnic-Themed Series: Chica Boom Best Foreign Vignette Series: Euro Angels Hardball Best Foreign Vignette Tape: Hustler XXX 11 Best Gonzo Series: The Voyeur Best Group Sex Scene—Video: Angel Long, Jay Ashley, Pat Myne, Assficianado Best Interactive DVD: Virtual Sex With Janine Best Male Newcomer: Nick Manning
 Best Music: Various Artists, America XXX Best Non-Sex Performance—Film or Video: Tina Tyler, The Ozporns, VCA Pictures
 Best Oral Sex Scene—Film: Belladonna, Rocco Siffredi, The Fashionistas
 Best Oral-Themed Feature: Throat Gaggers
 Best Oral-Themed Series: Gag Factor
 Best Overall Marketing Campaign—Company Image: Digital Playground, Wicked Pictures (tie)
 Best Overall Marketing Campaign—Individual Title or Series: Paradise Lost, Sin City Films
 Best Packaging: Hearts & Minds, New Sensations
 Best Pro-Am or Amateur Series: The Real Naturals
 Best Pro-Am or Amateur Tape: NYC Underground: Times Square Trash Vol. 2
 Best Screenplay—Film: Daniel Metcalf, Brad Armstrong, Jonathan Morgan, Falling From Grace
 Best Screenplay—Video: Michael Raven, Devan Sapphire, Breathless
 Best Sex Comedy: Kung-Fu Girls
 Best Sex Scene in a Foreign-Shot Production: Veronica B., Cindy, Henrietta, Karib, Katalin, Monik, Nikita, Niky, Sheila Scott, Petra Short, Stella Virgin, Rocco Siffredi, The Ass Collector
 Best Solo Sex Scene: Jenna Haze, Big Bottom Sadie
 Best Special Effects: Ninnwerx, Perfect
 Best Specialty Tape—Big Bust: Heavy Handfuls
 Best Specialty Tape—BDSM: Ivy Manor 5
 Best Specialty Tape—Foot Fetish: Barefoot Confidential 15
 Best Specialty Tape—Other Genre: Internal Affairs 5
 Best Specialty Tape—Spanking: Stocking Strippers Spanked 2
 Best Supporting Actor—Film: Mr. Marcus, Paradise Lost
 Best Supporting Actor—Video: Randy Spears, Hercules
 Best Supporting Actress—Film: Belladonna, The Fashionistas
 Best Tease Performance: Belladonna, The Fashionistas
 Best Transsexual Tape: Rogue Adventures 16
 Best Videography: Perfect, Michael Ninn
 Best Vignette Tape: Mason's Dirty Trixxx
 Best Vignette Series: Barely Legal
 Female Foreign Performer of the Year: Rita Faltoyano
 Male Foreign Performer of the Year: Rocco Siffredi
 Most Outrageous Sex Scene:''' "Autumn Haze's Big Dick", Autumn Haze vs. Son of Dong Honorary AVN Awards 

Reuben Sturman Award
 Mel Kamins, General Video Cleveland

Special DVD Recognition Award
 Wadd: The Life and Times of John C. Holmes, Cass Paley, VCA Interactive

Hall of Fame
AVN Hall of Fame inductees for 2003 were: T. T. Boy, Mark Davis, Felecia, Dave Hardman, Heather Hunter, Jill Kelly, Chasey Lain, Madison, Jonathan Morgan, Alex Sanders, Julian St. Jox, Kirdy Stevens, Tony Tedeschi, Teri Weigel

Multiple nominations and awards

The following releases received the most nominations.

 The following 13 releases received multiple awards:

Presenters and performers
The following individuals, listed in order of appearance, presented awards or performed musical numbers or comedy. The show's trophy girls were Taylor Starr and Tyler Starr, the Sin City Twins.

 Presenters  (in order of appearance) 

Performers

 Ceremony information 

AVN created several new categories for the year's awards show. Among them: Best Oral Sex Scene—Video, Best Male Newcomer, Best Director—Non-Feature, Male Foreign Performer of the Year and Female Foreign Performer of the Year.

The show was recorded for later broadcast and a DVD of the awards show was issued by VCA Pictures.

Performance of year's moviesBriana Loves Jenna'' was announced as the adult movie industry's top selling movie and also the top renting movie of the previous year.

See also

 AVN Award
 AVN Best New Starlet Award
 AVN Award for Male Performer of the Year
 AVN Award for Male Foreign Performer of the Year
 AVN Female Performer of the Year Award
 List of members of the AVN Hall of Fame
 2003 GayVN Awards

Notes

References

External links
 
2003 AVN Award nominees (archived at Wayback Machine, November 27, 2002)
 2003 AVN Award Winners (archived at Wayback Machine, February 10, 2003)
 Adult Video News Awards  at the Internet Movie Database
 
 
 

AVN Awards
2002 film awards